Philippe Delrieu (born 10 August 1959) is a French former fencer. He won a silver medal in the team sabre event at the 1984 Summer Olympics.

References

External links
 

1959 births
Living people
French male sabre fencers
Olympic fencers of France
Fencers at the 1984 Summer Olympics
Fencers at the 1988 Summer Olympics
Olympic silver medalists for France
Olympic medalists in fencing
Sportspeople from Tarbes
Medalists at the 1984 Summer Olympics
20th-century French people